Pretty Smart is an American sitcom created by Jack Dolgen and Doug Mand. The series stars Emily Osment, Gregg Sulkin, Olivia Macklin, Cinthya Carmona, and Michael Hsu Rosen. The series premiered on October 8, 2021, on Netflix. In April 2022, the series was canceled after one season.

Cast and characters

Main 

 Emily Osment as Chelsea, Claire's sister and aspiring novelist who graduated from Harvard
 Gregg Sulkin as Grant, Claire's ex-boyfriend and roommate. He works as a personal trainer at Build.
 Olivia Macklin as Claire, Chelsea's sister and roommates to Solana, Jayden, and Grant. She is a waitress at Franklin's.
 Cinthya Carmona as Solana, Claire's friend and roommate. Solana is a former lawyer-turned metaphysical, spiritual healer. It is later revealed her real name is Allison.
 Michael Hsu Rosen as Jayden, Claire's friend and roommate, who is a social media influencer

Recurring

 Geoff Ross as Howard, the manager and Claire's boss at Franklin's

Special guest star
 Ming-Na Wen as Jasmine, Jayden's estranged mother

Production 
On March 5, 2021, Netflix gave the production a series order consisting of ten episodes. The Untitled Dolgen/Mand/Kang Project is created by Jack Dolgen and Doug Mand who are expected to executive alongside Kourtney Kang and Pamela Fryman. Upon series order announcement, Emily Osment and Gregg Sulkin were cast to star. On March 29, 2021, Olivia Macklin, Michael Hsu Rosen, and Cinthya Carmona joined the main cast. The series was filmed at Sunset Bronson Studios in Hollywood, California. The series was later titled as Pretty Smart and it premiered on October 8, 2021. On April 27, 2022, Netflix cancelled the series after one season.

Episodes

Reception
The review aggregator website Rotten Tomatoes reported a 40% approval rating with an average rating of 4.8/10, based on 5 critic reviews.

References

External links 
 
 

2020s American sitcoms
2021 American television series debuts
2021 American television series endings
English-language Netflix original programming
Television shows set in Los Angeles